Brezovica is a village in the Municipality of Hrpelje-Kozina in the Littoral region of Slovenia.

The local parish church, built to the south just outside the settlement, is dedicated to Saint Stephen and belongs to the Koper Diocese.

References

External links

Brezovica on Geopedia

Populated places in the Municipality of Hrpelje-Kozina